The 2014–15 Qatari League, also known as Qatari Stars League, was the 42nd edition of top-level football championship in Qatar. The season started on 21 August 2014. Lekhwiya, the defending champions, won their fourth league title with one matchday remaining by winning against Al-Ahli on 12 April 2015.

Teams
Al Shamal were promoted as champions from the 2nd Division. They last played in the top flight in 2009–10. They are joined by 2nd Division runners up Al-Shahania who enter the top flight for the first time in their history. Relegated were Al Mu'aidar who lasted one season in the top flight and former power-house outfit Al Rayyan.

Stadia and locations

Kit manufacturer and sponsors

Stadium changes

El Jaish have moved out of the Qatar SC Stadium to join Lekhwiya at the Lekhwiya SC Stadium.
Al-Ahli have moved out of the Al-Ahli SC Stadium to join Al-Arabi at the Al-Arabi SC Stadium.
Al-Sailiya have moved out of the Al-Rayyan SC Stadium to join Al-Sadd at the Al-Sadd SC Stadium.
Umm Salal have moved out of the Al-Arabi SC Stadium to join Qatar SC at the Qatar SC Stadium.

Managerial changes

League table

Season statistics

Top scorers

Top assists

Awards

Monthly awards

References

External links
 

Qatar Stars League seasons
2014–15 in Asian association football leagues
2014–15 in Qatari football